José Aruego (August 9, 1932 – August 9, 2012) was a Filipino children's book author and illustrator. He was born in Manila and once worked as a lawyer. He died in New York City, where he lived for decades, on August 9, 2012.

Background
Aruego graduated from law school at the University of the Philippines and passed the bar. He came to New York City in 1956 and studied at Parsons School of Design. He started to pen cartoons and this was when his career really took off. Many of his cartoons were published in The New Yorker and The Saturday Evening Post.

Books
Aruego wrote 82 children's books. He lectured extensively at elementary schools, insisting on sketching a character into every book that he signed and teaching students to draw his alligators. Among his best known books were Whose Mouse Are You?, Leo the Late Bloomer and Gregory the Terrible Eater. He worked alongside Ariane Dewey in creating books that were about animals. Their first book was published in 1969. In 2006, they reunited to produce The Last Laugh, a picture book that had a strong anti-bullying message.

References

External links 
 José Aruego: A Filipino Illustrator
 Teacher Resource File

1932 births
2012 deaths
Filipino illustrators
People from Manila
Writers from Metro Manila
Writers from New York City